Roger de Clifford, 2nd Baron de Clifford, also 2nd Lord of Skipton (21 January 1300 – 23 March 1322) was a member of the Clifford family, which held the seat of Skipton from 1310 to 1676. He inherited his title when his father, Robert de Clifford, 1st Baron de Clifford died at the Battle of Bannockburn in 1314. His mother was Maud de Clare, eldest daughter of Thomas de Clare, Lord of Thomond and Juliana FitzGerald. Roger was also hereditary High Sheriff of Westmorland.

He was involved in a rebellion against King Edward II's favourite Hugh Despenser the Younger, and ultimately against the King himself. He took part in the Siege of Tickhill. The rebel forces were then brought to battle by the King's forces in Boroughbridge in March 1322; during the battle, Roger Clifford received severe wounds. Forced to surrender, he was condemned to death and held captive in York. He was hanged there, probably on 23 March, and his estates forfeited, including Skipton Castle. They were restored to his brother Robert Clifford, 3rd Lord of Skipton in 1327.

References

1300 births
1322 deaths
13th-century English nobility
14th-century English nobility
High Sheriffs of Westmorland
People executed by the Kingdom of England by hanging
Barons de Clifford
People executed under the Plantagenets